Serine/threonine-protein kinase WNK2 is an enzyme that in humans is encoded by the WNK2 gene.

The protein encoded by this gene is a cytoplasmic serine-threonine kinase that contains cysteine in place of the lysine found at the conserved ATP-binding location in subdomain II of protein kinases. Since this protein does have kinase activity, it is possible that another lysine in the kinase subdomain I can substitute for the missing conserved lysine.

References

Further reading